State Route 293 (SR 293) is a  north–south state highway in the northwestern portion of the U.S. state of Ohio. Its northern terminus is at the intersection of Sandusky Street and Cass Street in Wharton. The route was designated in 1932, and was extended south in 1997.

Route description

All of SR 293 exists within the western part of Wyandot County. SR 293 starts at the intersection of SR 53, and becomes concurrent with County Highway 95 (CH 95). There it travels into the village of Kirby, and crosses over a CSX railroad line, as it continues moving north. SR 293 then leaves Kirby and overpasses U.S. Route 30 (US 30). Less than a mile later, SR 293 turns west and becomes concurrent with Lincoln Highway (CH 330), as CH 95 continues to head north. SR 293 then crosses a bridge over Potato Run, followed by a turn west to downtown Wharton. The route ends at Cass Street, and the road continues as Sandusky Street. Nearly all of the route is in farmland.

History
SR 293 was established in 1932. The highway originally existed along its northernmost present stretch, connecting the village of Wharton with Lincoln Highway, which at one time was a part of US 30, and prior to that US 30N. From that point, it replaced what was previously designated as SR 699 south to SR 53 just south of Kirby. About ten years later, US 30 was moved to a new alignment south of the Lincoln Highway, no longer having direct access to SR 293.

Major intersections

See also

References

External links

293
Transportation in Wyandot County, Ohio